Catechol ( or ), also known as pyrocatechol or 1,2-dihydroxybenzene, is a toxic organic compound with the molecular formula . It is the ortho isomer of the three isomeric benzenediols. This colorless compound occurs naturally in trace amounts. It was first discovered by destructive distillation of the plant extract catechin. About 20,000 tonnes of catechol are now synthetically produced annually as a commodity organic chemical, mainly as a precursor to pesticides, flavors, and fragrances.

Catechol occurs as feathery white crystals that are very rapidly soluble in water.

Isolation and synthesis

Catechol was first isolated in 1839 by Edgar Hugo Emil Reinsch (1809–1884) by distilling it from the solid tannic preparation catechin, which is the residuum of catechu, the boiled or concentrated juice of Mimosa catechu (Acacia catechu). Upon heating catechin above its decomposition point, a substance that Reinsch first named Brenz-Katechusäure (burned catechu acid) sublimated as a white efflorescence. This was a thermal decomposition product of the flavanols in catechin.  In 1841, both Wackenroder and Zwenger independently rediscovered catechol; in reporting on their findings, Philosophical Magazine coined the name pyrocatechin. By 1852, Erdmann realized that catechol was benzene with two oxygen atoms added to it; in 1867, August Kekulé realized that catechol was a diol of benzene, so by 1868, catechol was listed as pyrocatechol. In 1879, the Journal of the Chemical Society recommended that catechol be called "catechol", and in the following year, it was listed as such.

Catechol has since been shown to occur in free form naturally in kino and in beechwood tar. Its sulfonic acid has been detected in the urine of horses and humans.

Catechol is produced industrially by the hydroxylation of phenol using hydrogen peroxide.
C6H5OH  +  H2O2  -> C6H4(OH)2  +  H2O

It can be produced by reaction of salicylaldehyde with base and hydrogen peroxide (Dakin oxidation), as well as the hydrolysis of 2-substituted phenols, especially 2-chlorophenol, with hot aqueous solutions containing alkali metal hydroxides. Its methyl ether derivative, guaiacol, converts to catechol via hydrolysis of the  bond as promoted by hydroiodic acid (HI).

Reactions

Organic chemistry 
Like other difunctional benzene derivatives, catechol readily condenses to form heterocyclic compounds.  Cyclic esters are formed upon treatment with dichloro electrophiles. For example, using phosphorus trichloride or phosphorus oxychloride gives the cyclic chlorophosphonite or chlorophosphonate, respectively; sulfuryl chloride gives the sulfate; and phosgene gives the carbonate:
C6H4(OH)2  +  XCl2  ->  C6H4(O2X)  +  2 HCl where X = PCl or POCl; ; CO

With metal ions 
Basic solutions of catechol react with iron(III) to give the red . Ferric chloride gives a green coloration with the aqueous solution, while the alkaline solution rapidly changes to a green and finally to a black color on exposure to the air. Iron-containing dioxygenase enzymes catalyze the cleavage of catechol.

Redox chemistry 
Catechols convert to the semiquinone radical.  At , this conversion occurs at 100 mV:
C6H4(OH)2  ->  C6H4(O)(OH)  +  1/2 H2

For the redox of the semiquinone radical to the catecholate dianion, the potential ranges from 530 to 43 mV as the pH varies from 7 to 13.5:
C6H4(OH)2  ->  C6H4O2^2-  +  H+

Catechol is produced by a reversible two-electron, two-proton reduction of 1,2-benzoquinone ( vs SHE;  vs SHE).

The redox series catecholate dianion, monoanionic semiquinonate, and benzoquinone are collectively called dioxolenes. Dioxolenes can function as ligands for metal ions.

Natural occurrences 
Small amounts of catechol occur naturally in fruits and vegetables, along with the enzyme polyphenol oxidase (also known as catecholase, or catechol oxidase). Upon mixing the enzyme with the substrate and exposure to oxygen (as when a potato or apple is cut and left out), the colorless catechol oxidizes to reddish-brown melanoid pigments, derivatives of benzoquinone. The enzyme is inactivated by adding an acid, such as citric acid contained in lemon juice. Excluding oxygen also prevents the browning reaction. However, the activity of the enzyme increases in cooler temperatures. Benzoquinone is said to be antimicrobial, a property that slows the spoilage of damaged fruits and other plant parts.

Catechol derivatives 

Catechol derivatives are found widely in nature. They often arise by hydroxylation of phenols.
Arthropod cuticle consists of chitin linked by a catechol moiety to protein. The cuticle may be strengthened by Cross-linking (tanning and sclerotization), in particular, in insects, and of course by biomineralization.

4-tert-Butylcatechol, which is synthetic, not natural, is used as an antioxidant and polymerisation inhibitor.

Uses 
Approximately 50% of the synthetic catechol is consumed in the production of pesticides, the remainder being used as a precursor to fine chemicals such as perfumes and pharmaceuticals. It is a common building block in organic synthesis. Several industrially significant flavors and fragrances are prepared starting from catechol. Guaiacol is prepared by methylation of catechol and is then converted to vanillin on a scale of about 10M kg per year (1990). The related monoethyl ether of catechol, guethol, is converted to ethylvanillin, a component of chocolate confectioneries. 3-trans-Isocamphylcyclohexanol, widely used as a replacement for sandalwood oil, is prepared from catechol via guaiacol and camphor. Piperonal, a flowery scent, is prepared from the methylene diether of catechol followed by condensation with glyoxal and decarboxylation.

Catechol is used as a black-and-white photographic developer, but, except for some special purpose applications, its use is largely historical. It is rumored to have been used briefly in Eastman Kodak's HC-110 developer and is rumored to be a component in Tetenal's Neofin Blau developer.  It is a key component of Finol from Moersch Photochemie in Germany. Modern catechol developing was pioneered by noted photographer Sandy King. His "PyroCat" formulation is popular among modern black-and-white film photographers. King's work has since inspired further 21st-century development by others such as Jay De Fehr with Hypercat and Obsidian Acqua developers, and others.

Nomenclature 
Although rarely encountered, the officially "preferred IUPAC name" (PIN) of catechol is benzene-1,2-diol. The trivial name pyrocatechol is a retained IUPAC name, according to the 1993 Recommendations for the Nomenclature of Organic Chemistry.

See also 
 Enol
 Pyrogallol
 Thiotimoline

References

External links 

 International Chemical Safety Card 0411
 NIOSH Pocket Guide to Chemical Hazards
 IARC Monograph: "Catechol"
 IUPAC Nomenclature of Organic Chemistry (online version of the "Blue Book")

 
Antioxidants
Chelating agents
Enediols
IARC Group 2B carcinogens
Photographic chemicals
Reducing agents